The knock-out stage of the 2013 AFC Cup was played from 14 May to 2 November 2013. A total of 16 teams competed in the knock-out stage.

Qualified teams
The winners and runners-up of each of the eight groups in the group stage qualified for the knock-out stage. Both West Asia Zone and East Asia Zone had eight teams qualified.

Format
In the knock-out stage, the 16 teams played a single-elimination tournament. In the quarter-finals and semi-finals, each tie was played on a home-and-away two-legged basis, while in the round of 16 and final, each tie was played as a single match. The away goals rule (for two-legged ties), extra time (away goals do not apply in extra time) and penalty shoot-out were used to decide the winner if necessary.

Schedule
The schedule of each round was as follows.

Bracket
In the round of 16, the winners of one group played the runners-up of another group in the same zone, with the group winners hosting the match. The matchups were determined as follows:

West Asia Zone
Winner Group A vs. Runner-up Group C
Winner Group C vs. Runner-up Group A
Winner Group B vs. Runner-up Group D
Winner Group D vs. Runner-up Group B

East Asia Zone
Winner Group E vs. Runner-up Group G
Winner Group G vs. Runner-up Group E
Winner Group F vs. Runner-up Group H
Winner Group H vs. Runner-up Group F

The draw for the quarter-finals, semi-finals, and final (to decide the host team) was held on 20 June 2013, 15:00 UTC+8, at the AFC House in Kuala Lumpur, Malaysia. In this draw, teams from different zones could play each other, and the "country protection" rule was applied: if there are two teams from the same association, they may not play each other in the quarter-finals.

Round of 16
The matches were played on 14 and 15 May 2013.

|-
!colspan=3|West Asia Zone

|-
!colspan=3|East Asia Zone

Quarter-finals
The first legs were played on 17 September 2013, and the second legs were played on 24 September 2013.

First leg

Second leg

East Bengal won 2–1 on aggregate.

2–2 on aggregate. Al-Qadsia won on away goals.

Al-Faisaly won 4–2 on aggregate.

Al-Kuwait won 12–2 on aggregate.

Notes

Semi-finals
The first legs were played on 1 and 2 October 2013, and the second legs were played on 22 October 2013.

First leg

Notes

Second leg

Al-Kuwait won 7–2 on aggregate.

Al-Qadsia won 3–1 on aggregate.

Final

The final was played on 2 November 2013.

References

External links

3